Aksel (Turkish literally "white (ak) flood (sel)") is a Turkish surname. Notable people with the surname include:

 Ayda Aksel (born 1962), Turkish actress
 Gürsel Aksel (1937–1978), Turkish footballer

Turkish-language surnames